Antônio Marcos Sousa (born February 2, 1990), sometimes known as just Marcos  is a  footballer who plays as an attacking midfielder. Born in Brazil, he represented the Timor-Leste national team.

International career
Sousa was born at São Paulo, Brazil, and is a naturalized citizen of East Timor. He made his debut for the Portuguese-speaking Southeast Asian country in a friendly match against Indonesia U23 on October 25, 2011 which they lost (5–0).

Sousa attempted to score a goal at all the match he played. Especially during the second match at 2011 SEA Games against Philippines U23.

References

External links
Aseabfootball.org
 Marcos File at 2011 SEAG

1990 births
Living people
Footballers from São Paulo
East Timorese footballers
Timor-Leste international footballers
Brazilian footballers
Association football forwards
Brazilian emigrants to East Timor
Association football midfielders